James Munroe may refer to:
 James Phinney Munroe (1862–1929), American author, businessman, professor and genealogist
 Jim Munroe, Canadian science fiction writer
 James Munroe (New York politician) (1815–1869), American politician
 James Munroe Canty (1865–1964), American educator, school administrator, and businessperson

See also
 James Munro (disambiguation)
 James Monroe (disambiguation)